Daily Desher Katha ( Ḍeili Desher Kôtha) is a Bengali daily newspaper published from Agartala. It is a daily publication of the state committee of CPI(M), Tripura.

History
Desher Katha was founded in 1979.  The newspaper came under the severe attack launched on it the during the chaotic Congress-TUJS coalition regime.

References

External links
Desher Katha Celebrates 30 Years of Publication

Bengali-language newspapers published in India
Mass media in Tripura
Newspapers established in 1979
Communist periodicals published in India
1979 establishments in Tripura
Agartala
Newspapers published in Tripura